Bulletin of the Iraq Natural History Museum is a peer-reviewed open access scholarly journal publishing original articles, article reviews, and case reports in the natural history sciences. It affiliated with the Iraq Natural History Research Center and Museum / University of Baghdad. The current editor-in-chief is Razzaq Shalan Augul.

Abstracting and indexing 
The journal is abstracted and indexed in:

References

External links 
 

Open access journals
Publications established in 1961
English-language journals
Biology journals
Earth and atmospheric sciences journals